The Bangkok Tennis Classic was a men's tennis tournament played in Bangkok, Thailand from 1980 until 1982. The event was part of the Grand Prix tennis circuit and was held on indoor carpet courts.

Finals

Singles

Doubles

See also
 Bangkok Open – women's tournament
 List of tennis tournaments

References
ITF Vault
ITF Vault
ITF Vault

1980 establishments in Thailand
1982 disestablishments in Thailand
Tennis
Tennis
Grand Prix tennis circuit
Carpet court tennis tournaments
Indoor tennis tournaments
November sporting events
Recurring sporting events established in 1980
Recurring events disestablished in 1982
Tennis
Tennis in Bangkok
Tennis tournaments in Thailand
Defunct tennis tournaments in Thailand